Francesco Salata (17 September 1876 – 10 March 1944) was an Italian senator, politician, journalist, historian and writer. Salata was an irredentist, although he had a more legalistic approach than other contemporaries, as well as being more liberal. He was panned and attacked by the fascists, although, after they took power, he was employed by the fascist government, and wrote books apologizing for the fascist politics. Very fond of his native Istria, Salata opposed what he saw as the slavicisation carried out by Croatian priests in Istria, the Kvarner and Dalmatia. He accused the Slovenian and Croatian clergy of carrying out the slavicisation of Istria and the Kvarner. Salata upheld the idea that Dalmatia, Istria and the Kvarner were, historically, Italian lands.

Among his best-known works are Guglielmo Oberdan secondo gli atti segreti del processo: carteggi diplomatici e altri documenti inediti (1924), republished in a reduced version as Oberdan in 1932, Il patto Mussolini: storia di un piano politico e di un negoziato diplomatico (1933), and Il nodo di Gibuti: storia diplomatica su documenti inediti (1939).

Biography
Salata was born on 17 September 1876 in Ossero, on the island of Cres, which at the time was part of the Austro-hungarian empire. His family wasn't hereditary aristocratic but nonetheless was well-to-do. His father was podestà of Ossero from 1883 until 1901.

In 1911 Salata married Ilda Mizzan, from a Pisino family. They had a daughter together, Maria, born in 1911. Salata toured Istria with Gabriele D'Annunzio, who, years before she engaged to Salata, dedicated a copy of his Francesca da Rimini to Mizzan, writing on it "to the young lady Ilda Mizzan, Who painted the flowers for Pisino's canteen, Live like those which poured from the windows..."

As early as in his high school years, Salata risked to be expelled from all the schools of the empire because of his attempts to found a branch of the Lega Nazionale in Ossero, which promoted the Italian language and culture in territories inhabited by Germans, Croatians and Slovenians, that is Trentino and the Adriatic coast.

After attending high school in Capodistria (Koper), Salata studied law at the University of Vienna (a total of seven semesters). He also studied two semesters at the University of Graz. Salata interrupted his studies to dedicate himself first to journalism and then to his studies on history. In 1888 he was the editor of Pola's (Pula) Il popolo istriano, and later a collaborator of Trieste's "Il Piccolo".

He participated in conferences of the Italian society of archaeology in Istria (Società istriana di archeologia e storia patria). His first intervention was on Francesco Patrizi, and it was published under the name Nel terzo centenario della morte di Francesco Patrizio – negli Atti e memorie della Società istriana di archeologia e storia patria. With his works L’antica diocesi di Ossero e la liturgia slava: pagine di storia patria (1897) and Nuovi studi sulla liturgia slava (1897), he joined the debate against the exploitation of the paleoslavic liturgy carried out by Slavic (Croatian) priests to promote the use of Croatian in the Catholic churches of Istria and the Kvarner. Both works end with an attack on the Slovenian and Croatian clergy. His subsequent works are increasingly patriotic.

Salata joined the Società politica istriana (SPI), believing in the civic and cultural superiority of the Italian element, which, because of this, was entitled to govern the res publica. According to Salata, this "preeminence" conformed to the "Austrian law of political representation of classes and interests," and it derived from the important number of Italians in modern-day Croatian lands and their "civic value and contributive force." According to Salata, Italians were superior "in ownership, intelligence and venerable culture." Salata became secretary and vice-president of the SPI in 1903. The party promoted Italian culture in Istria, fighting for positions of control in the local administrations. It also fought for the consolidation of the use of the Italian language at an administrative level and in schools.

Salata went to Rome for administrative reasons in the beginning of 1915, just a few months before the outbreak of World War I. He decided to stay, in order to plead his cause for Italy's intervention in the war. He came into contact with the Commissione centrale di patronato dei fuoriusciti trentini e adriatici, and started to prepare material to support Italy's claim on the Adriatic lands. In May 1915 he published anonymously Il diritto d'Italia su Trieste e l'Istria: documenti, in which he claimed that Italy had the "right and duty to the integration of its national unity and Adriatic dominion." In this volume Salata attempted to prove that the Italian right to Istria was based on history, rather than "on the wings of Dante's and Carducci's poetry." The documents provided by Salata started with the 1797 Treaty of Campo Formio and terminated with the 1882 Triple Alliance, although there were also indirect references to Rome and Venice.

In both the war and interwar period, Salata was employed as both an historian and administrator of the contested regions. In the first month after Italy's entry into the war, Salata entered the Secretary General for the "Civic Affairs at the Supreme Command of the Army in the War Zone" (Segretariato generale per gli affari civili presso il Comando supremo dell'esercito in zona di guerra), and was increasingly given more responsibilities. He eventually became the vice-secretary of the agency.

In the meantime, the Austrian authorities retaliated on his wife Ilda Mizzan and his daughter Maria, who were incarcerated for more than a year, from 1916 to 1917. There would be dire consequences for his wife, who died of tuberculosis in 1922, after years spent between sanatoriums and resting places.

After the war, Salata took part in the Paris Convention of 1919, to produce material supporting Italy's claim, and contest those of the State of Slovenes, Croats and Serbs. In 1919 he was named 2nd class prefect. He later gained more power, and was entrusted with the direction of the Ufficio centrale delle Nuove provincie. He also became Councilor of State. Salata endeavored to adapt the newly annexed territories to Italy, but also to preserve the positive aspects of the autonomy those territories had had under Austria. Because of this, he clashed with less liberal, prominent politicians. The latter opposed any concessions to the minority German speaking and Slavic speaking populations. At this time, Salata's moderatism and liberalism were being threatened by the growing nationalism and fascism.

Salata always had the strong support of Prime Minister Nitti, and was likewise supported by Giovanni Giolitti, who employed him in the negotiations that led to the signing of the treaty of Rapallo in 1920. A few days after the treaty, Salata was named senator. During the first Bonomi government, Salata's sway decreased. However, he was able to establish regional advisory panels, which were open to the prominent local political personalities of the different areas, including from the minorities, which were given the duty of studying and approve the process of annexation of the new territories to Italy.

He was criticized and verbally attacked by the fascists, who made propaganda against him and in 1922 attacked the car in which he was travelling with his daughter during a visit to Trento. The fascists celebrated the suppression of the Ufficio centrale delle Nuove provincie by the Facta government, which took place on 17 October 1922. The latter event paved the way for the definitive annexation of the terre irredente, without regard to the local population, its language, culture and administrative practices.

In 1924 Salata published his extensive work on Oberdan, Guglielmo Oberdan secondo gli atti segreti del processo: carteggi diplomatici e altri documenti inediti, which was republished simply as Oberdan in a reduced version in 1932. In this work Salata defends the Italian full-bloodedness of Oberdan with arguments "that are not very persuasive." Salata claims that Oberdan's mother, Gioseffa Maria Oberdank, had been “Italian for many generations" and thus "in the martyr’s veins there ran no mixed blood, but purely Italian blood, both from his mother’s and his father’s side." The book was well received in Fascist Italy. After publishing his book on Oberdan and other treaties such as L'Italia e la Triplice: secondo i nuovi documenti austro-germanici (1923), Salata was employed by Mussolini and the Italian regime as an expert in archives and historian "of patriotic inspiration". He was appointed to several prominent positions in the Italian academic world. He obtained the Fascist Party card ad honorem in 1929, on the occasion of his speech in Pisino (Pazin), and was signed to the National Fascist Uninon of the Senate (Unione nazionale fascista del Senato). As an intellectual of the regime, he legitimized fascism as the heir, or continuator, of the Risorgimento. He then published many books on history and politics, including several books on the king of Sardinia Charles Albert. Salata praised Mussolini in his Il patto Mussolini: storia di un piano politico e di un negoziato diplomatico (1933).

In 1934 he was invited to Vienna (where, in spite of his irredentist ideas, he was still held in high esteem<ref>(Italian) [...] fra le personalità italiane che più[...] hanno goduto credito in quel paese [l'Austria], vanno ricordati il consigliere di stato Brocchi[...]e il senatore Francesco Salata», Fulvio Suvich, Memorie (1932-1936), Milano, Rizzoli Editore, 1984, p 80, </ref>), to work on the creation of the Istituto Italiano di Cultura, of which he became the director in 1935. In 1936 he became Italian ambassador to Austria. In this capacity he embarked on a ruinous policy of safeguarding Austria's autonomy and later independence from Germany. In order to support Italy's aggressive policies, he published Il nodo di Gibuti: storia diplomatica su documenti inediti (1939), Nizza fra Garibaldi e Cavour: un discorso non pronunciato e altri documenti inediti (in Storia e politica internazionale, rassegna trimestrale) in 1940. In 1943 he was named President of the Foreign Affairs Committee of the Senate.

Salata died in 1944 in Rome, a few months before the city was liberated by the Anglo-American troops.

References

 External links 
Italian Senate Page

Sources
 Paolo Ziller: Le Nuove province nell'immediato dopoguerra. Tra ricostruzione e autonomie amministrative (1918-1922), in Miscellanea di studi giuliani in onore di Giulio Cervani per il suo XLL compleanno, edited by F. Salimbeni, Udine 1990, pp. 243–274
 Paolo Ziller: Francesco Salata. Il bollettino la “Vita autonoma” (1904-1912) ed il liberalismo nazionale istriano nell’ultima Austria, in Atti - Centro di ricerche storiche, Rovigno, 1995, 25, pp. 423–445
 Paolo Ziller: Giuliani, istriani e trentini dall'Impero asburgico al Regno d'Italia: società, istituzioni e rapporti etnici, Udine 1997
 Luca Riccardi: Francesco Salata tra storia, politica e diplomazia, Udine 2001
 Luca Riccardi: Francesco Salata, il trattato di Rapallo e la politica estera italiana verso la Jugoslavia all’inizio degli anni Venti, in Quaderni giuliani di storia, 1994, 2, pp. 75–91
 Luca Riccardi: Le carte Salata: quarant’anni tra politica e storia, in Quaderni giuliani di storia'', 1991, 1-2, pp. 77–92

1876 births
1944 deaths
People from Istria
Members of the Senate of the Republic (Italy)
Members of the Senate of the Kingdom of Italy
Ambassadors of Italy to Austria